Pitmedden is a rural village in the parish of Udny, Aberdeenshire, Scotland, situated midway between Ellon and Oldmeldrum, and approximately  distant from Aberdeen. In addition to local shops, primary school, church, village hall and parks, the village is home to Pitmedden Garden, originally created in the 17th century by Sir Alexander Seton and gifted to the National Trust for Scotland in 1952, and the Formartine United Football Club.

Pitmedden along with the Parish of Udny is served by the Udny Community Trust, which owns and operates an Enercon E48 wind turbine at Tillymaud to the south of Pitmedden. Udny Community Trust distributes the profits from the wind energy project for local charitable purposes.

The village and most of Udny are served by a Community Newsletter called the Pitmedden News.

During World War II, Pitmedden had a prisoner of war camp. This was located on the south side of the Bronie Burn, and there was an access bridge to access it. The entrance to the camp is about 100 yards from the Aberdeen/Tarves/Oldmeldrum fork in Pitmedden, on the Oldmeldrum road. On 25 October 1945 at the Millton of Dumbreck farm, 36 year old Italian prisoner of war Martino Favilli died of an illness. Prisoners cycled each day to work on local farms; one local farmer still has small items made by the prisoners.

During the excavation of a Transco gas pipeline near Pitmedden, the wreckage of two crashed aircraft were discovered.

Notable residents
Terry McDermott

References

External links

 Pitmedden website 

Villages in Aberdeenshire
World War II prisoner of war camps in Scotland